Saint Wanas was a Coptic child martyr born to poor parents from Thebes (now Luxor), Egypt. He is venerated as the patron saint of lost things.

Life and Martyrdom
St Wanas was an only son and a servant in the church. He lived during a period of persecution under the Romans. He became known as a fearless and wise speaker who helped people to adhere to the Christian faith. Consequently, the Roman Governor Arianus of Alexandria (who later became a Christian martyr himself) was displeased when he heard of this saint. Arianus was the Roman ruler of Ansena (Antinoöpolis),. He sent soldiers with orders to make him abandon his faith. The child refused so the governor ordered him to be tortured by cutting off his head. That was on 16th Hathor of the Coptic calendar. He was martyred during the same period as other child martyrs such as Saint Abanoub.

Other People Named Wanas
 Bishop Wanas
 Saint Wanas of Luxor  (Bishop Youannis (John))

Notes

Saints from Roman Egypt
4th-century Christian martyrs
Christian child saints